The Sada News Agency, or SNA, is one of the Iraqi news agencies, one of the media sectors of the Iraqi Media Network is linked directly to the Federation of Journalists of Iraq, its headquarters in Baghdad and has branches and centers inside Iraq only. And certified in the Federation of Journalists of Iraq No. (1530) for the year 2008.

See also
 National Iraqi News Agency
 Kuwait News Agency
 Jordan News Agency

References

External links
 Official website

2008 establishments in Iraq
News agencies based in Iraq
Arabic-language mass media
Arabic-language websites
Arab news agencies
Mass media in Baghdad